The Mk44 Bushmaster II is a 30 mm chain gun manufactured by Northrop Grumman.  It is a derivative of the 25 mm M242 Bushmaster, and uses 70% of the same parts as the M242 while increasing the firepower by as much as 50% with the 20% increase in caliber size. The barrel is chromium-plated for extended life. The gun uses standard GAU-8 Avenger ammunition that is available in API (Armor-Piercing Incendiary), HEI (High-Explosive Incendiary) and APFSDS-T (Armor-Piercing Fin-Stabilized Discarding Sabot-Tracer) variants.
The gun can be converted to a caliber of 40x180 mm, which involves changing the barrel and a few key parts, to use the SuperShot 40 cartridge. It can also be converted to use the 30x170 mm RARDEN cartridge.

History
The Bushmaster II is the standard primary armament of the Bionix-II AFV currently in service with the Singapore Army, the KTO Rosomak in Polish service, and the CV90 AFVs in Finnish, Norwegian and Swiss service.  Although the United States Air Force selected this cannon to replace the 25 mm GAU-12 Equalizer and Bofors 40 mm Automatic Gun L/60 guns on its fleet of AC-130U gunships in 2007. This plan was later canceled. The United States Marine Corps' Expeditionary Fighting Vehicle, which has been canceled, was expected to be armed with this cannon as well.  Some United States Navy vessels, such as the new  amphibious transport dock are armed with the Bushmaster II for surface threat defense.

The Bushmaster II cannon is used in the DS30M Mark 2 Automated Small Calibre Gun (ASCG) point defense system that is fitted to the Royal Navy's Type 23 frigates.

The Bushmaster II cannon is also used in the Turkish made Aselsan SMASH stabilized weapon station.

The USAF had experimented with installing Bushmaster II cannons on their AC-130U gunships in place of the GAU-12 and Bofors 40 mm cannons.  On 11 August 2008, the effort was canceled because of problems with the Bushmaster's accuracy in tests "at the altitude we were employing it." There were also schedule considerations that drove the decision. On 9 July 2012, the Air Force type classified a new version of the Bushmaster called the GAU-23/A.  The cannon will be used on the AC-130W and the AC-130J gunships.

The U.S. Navy uses the Mk44 Bushmaster II in the Mk 46 Mod 2 Gun Weapon System (GWS). The GWS is produced by General Dynamics to give warships protection against small, high-speed surface craft. A Mk 46 turret consists of the 30 mm chain gun, a forward looking infrared (FLIR) sensor, a low light television camera, and a laser rangefinder. The guns fire at 200 rounds per minute and are fed by a 400-round magazine through 200-round dual feeds. In 2012, the Navy decided to replace the Mk 110 57 mm cannons on s with the Mk 46 GWS.

Orbital ATK developed a modified version of the Bushmaster II, known as the Mk44 STRETCH, which can fire the 30x173mm Mk310 PABM-T airburst round.

In January 2020, Northrop Grumman revealed the development of proximity airburst rounds for the LCS' 30 mm gun modules to destroy small unmanned aerial vehicles (UAVs). Since the modules feature dual feeders, different types of rounds could be fed for different targets.

XM813
The XM813 Bushmaster is based on the Mk44 and is offered as an upgrade for U.S. Army M1126 Stryker and M2 Bradley vehicles, as well as having been a contender to be the primary armament of the Ground Combat Vehicle. Improvements include a 2.54 cm (1 inch) longer barrel, integral mount to increase first round hit probability by up to 10%, a dual recoil system to enhance accuracy and cope with future hotter propellants, and a Meggitt linkless dual feed ammunition system. The 30 mm chain gun can fire Mk310 Programmable Air Burst Munition rounds to attack targets in defilade.  The United States Army Research, Development and Engineering Command helped enhance the XM813 mainly for safety and turret integration.  By changing five parts, the gun caliber can be increased to 40 mm.  As of November 2013, the XM813 was being tested at Aberdeen Proving Ground over three months to ensure reliability levels of 40,000 mean rounds between failures.  Long-term plans are to equip vehicles with the Bushmaster III 35mm/50mm cannon.

The XM813 was demonstrated in September 2014 at the ARDEC Digital Multi-Purpose Range Complex. An enhanced fire control system improves long-range accuracy to kill targets with fewer bursts, sometimes as few as two or three rounds instead of 10. The XM813 30 mm cannon is intended to replace the M242 Bushmaster 25 mm chain gun, and can be mounted on vehicles other than the Bradley. Two capabilities not demonstrated were its linkless ammunition with airburst capabilities; airburst rounds increase lethality by enabling engagement of targets in defilade when they would otherwise only be suppressed by fire.

In early 2015, the U.S. Army approved an upgrade for 81 Stryker vehicles of a Stryker Brigade Combat Team deployed in Europe to be upgunned with the Mk44 30 mm Bushmaster cannon to increase their lethality against other light armored vehicles used by Russia in the theater. The cannons will be installed by 2018, and may be the first step in adding the Bushmaster to the entire active fleet of about 1,000 Strykers; the XM813 variant will be used with the Strykers. The first upgunned Stryker, known as the "Dragoon" for the 2nd Cavalry Regiment the vehicles will be part of, was delivered in October 2016, and the first Infantry Carrier Vehicle - Dragoon (ICVD) was delivered to the 2CR in Germany in December 2017.

The ATK MK44-ABM variant of the Bushmaster was selected in 2018 by the Spanish Army to equip the Tizona turret of the Line version (IFV) of the Dragón IFV, the replacement of the Pegaso BMR.

Users

 
 Navy: Gowind-class design
 
 Army: VBTP-MR Guarani
 Navy: 
 
 Army: Pandur II CZ
 
 Army: CV9030FIN

Army: Pindad Cobra IFV
Navy: Mamuju-class, Pari-class patrol vessel, Pollux-class research vessel and Clurit-class fast attack craft
Coast Guard: Tanjung Datu-class and Pulau Nipah-class offshore patrol vessel

 Army: Mowag Piranha
 
 Coast Guard: s, s (later ships), & s
 
 Army: IFV Vilkas
 
 Navy:  and 
 
 Army: CV9030N
 
 Navy: s and Shaldag Mk.V missile fast attack craft
 
 Army: KTO Rosomak
 Army: Borsuk (infantry fighting vehicle) 
 
 Army: Pandur II
 
 Army: Mowag Piranha V
 
 Army: Bionix II
 Army: Hunter AFV
 
 Army: Dragón IFV
 
 Army: CV9030CH

 Army: CM-34 (IFV variant)
 
 Navy: Tachin-class frigate, Krabi-class offshore patrol vessel, Leamsing-class patrol craft (gun),  coastal patrol craft, T.994-class coastal patrol craft, Angthong-class amphibious transport dock and Ladya-class mine countermeasure vessel
 
 Navy: Type 23 frigate, Type 45 destroyer
 
 Army: XM1296 Stryker Dragoon
Navy:  transport ship, Littoral combat ship and 
 Air Force: AC-130W, AC-130J (GAU-23/A)
 Coast Guard: Polar Security Cutter

Munitions

See also
 Bushmaster 25 mm chain gun
 Bushmaster III 35/50 mm chain gun
 Bushmaster IV 40 mm chain gun
 30mm Shipunov 2A42—Soviet/Russian autocannon
 30mm L21A1 RARDEN—British autocannon
 Future Combat Systems Infantry Carrier Vehicle

References
 http://www.atk.com/Products/documents/108279_01_Mk44.pdf
 Notes

External links
 Alliant Techsystems (ATK) Mk44 Bushmaster Automatic Cannon Fact Sheet
 Alliant Techsystems (ATK) GAU-23 Bushmaster Automatic Cannon Fact Sheet
 30mm Bushmaster II on NavWeap.Com
 Mk44 Bushmaster II 30mm on GlobalSecurity.Org

30 mm artillery
Autocannon
Vehicle weapons
United States Marine Corps equipment
Alliant Techsystems
Military equipment introduced in the 1970s